Labroye is a commune in the Pas-de-Calais department in northern France.

Geography
Labroye is situated in a hillside environment in the valley of the river Authie, which flows through the village. A mixture of woodland and farms, the village has many examples of typical Picardie houses, built in the traditional style with wattle and daub, covered in tar and then whitewashed.
The village is at the crossroads of two départemental routes. One, north-south going from
Hesdin to Abbeville, the D928 and the other going east-west to Auxi-le-Château and on to Berck, the D119.

Demography

Economy
Agricultural activity is confined to the raising of cattle for milk and beef, and pig farming
.

Places of interest
 The church, solid and reinforced, was once accompanied by a castle, which gave refuge to Philippe VI following the battle of Crecy that took place some kilometres to the south on August 26, 1346.
 A campground, a restaurant, and some guest rooms are available for tourist leisure activities: hunting, fishing, and walking.

See also
Communes of the Pas-de-Calais department

References

Communes of Pas-de-Calais
Artois